Phostria gravitalis is a moth in the family Crambidae. It was described by Saalmüller in 1880. It is found in Madagascar.

References

Phostria
Moths described in 1880
Moths of Madagascar